USS Comte de Grasse (DD-974), named for Admiral Francois-Joseph Paul, Comte de Grasse (1722–1788), was a  built by the Ingalls Shipbuilding Division of Litton Industries at Pascagoula, Mississippi.
She was laid down 4 April 1975, launched 26 March 1976 and commissioned 5 August 1978. She was christened 21 May 1976 by sponsor Madame Anne-Aymone Sauvage de Brantes, wife of the then-President of France, Valéry Giscard d'Estaing.

Operational history 
After being commissioned in August 1978, Comte de Grasse journeyed to homeport in Norfolk, Virginia. She would make a deployment to the Caribbean to participate in training in Guantanamo Bay, Cuba, and Puerto Rico. While there she also made a port call in Nassau, Bahamas. On 2 August 1979, Comte de Grasse suffered a fire in her Number 1 engine room while in Norfolk. Five sailors received minor injuries. The waste heat boiler and electrical gear were damaged. In the Fall of 1979, she deployed to Northern Europe to participate in NATO Exercises. She visited Brest, France, Dunkirk, France, Hamburg, Germany, and Portsmouth, England.

1980s 
In the early Spring of 1980, Comte de Grasse visited New York City, the hometown of Captain Frank J. Lugo. In late February-early March 1980, Comte de Grasse took part in Exercise Safepass-80. Comte de Grasse sailed on her maiden Mediterranean deployment in April 1980, returning home in December. Since then she deployed there six times.

In February 1981, Comte de Grasse went to the Vieques NGFS Range. The following month, she took part in READEX 1–81. In May, she took part in a Comprehensive Training Unit Exercise (COMPTUEX) in the Virginia Capes Operations Area. In late August, she took part in Ocean Venture-81 and exercise Magic Sword. In September, she took part in Exercise Ocean Safari-81. She was drydocked for a short period in November for voyage repairs and replacement of her Sonar Dome Rubber Window, before departing for a Mediterranean deployment on 1 December.

1982 saw Comte de Grasse take part in Exercise Sardinia-82 from 27 February to 9 March. She then took part in Exercise Norther Wedding/United Effort-82 from 23 August to 20 October. From 7 to 14 December, she took part in COMPTUEX 1–83.

From 8 January to 10 July 1983, she deployed to join NATO's Standing Naval Forces Atlantic. During that time, she took part in Exercise Roebuck near Scotland, Spring Train off Gibraltar, Bright Horizon and May West off Norway, Nor Ops, and Ocean Safari. Upon her return home, she was drydocked from 28 October 1983 to 10 July 1984 for a routine overhaul at Ingalls Shipyard, Pascagoula, MS.

From 4 to 13 September, she underwent Harpoon Certification, Tomahawk Material Certification, and from 24 to 26 September, Combat Systems Ship Qualification Test (CSSQT), at the Virginia Capes Operations Area.

From 19 to 23 March 1985, Comte de Grasse underwent Tomahawk Tactical Qualification Test (TTQT). Then from 22 April to 7 May, she participated in COMPTUEX 2–85, before deploying to join the Middle East Force on 6 June. She transited the Suez Canal into the Red Sea on 26 June and entered the Persian Gulf on 4 July. She took part in Exercise Inferno Creek/Bright Star-85 from 11 to 17 August. Transiting though the Suez Canal into the Mediterranean Sea on 15 November, she returned home on 5 December.

1986 saw Comte de Grasse take part in a number of gunnery, air targeting and submarine tracking exercises in the Virginia Capes and Puerto Rico operations areas. From 4 to 8 September, she took part in drug interception operations in the Caribbean.

Comte de Grasse took part, from 9 to 28 January 1987, in BLASTEX 1–87, and from 10 February to 1 March, in FLEETEX 1–87. She departed for her Mediterranean deployment 3–87 on 6 June and returned home on 17 November.

From 11 to 23 May 1988, Comte de Grasse took part in a USN/FGN missile exercise. Then from 15 June to 1 July, she participated in FLEETEX 2–88 (BASIC). From 12 August to 1 September, she assisted United States Coast Guard law enforcement operations in the Caribbean operations area. Then, from 7 to 22 November, she participated in FLEETEX 1–89 (ADV) and SOCEX 1–89.

From 8 February to 1 March 1989, Comte de Grasse took part in FLEETEX 1–89. She was in drydock from 14 April to 7 May at Norfolk Naval Shipyard, Portsmouth, Virginia, for replacement of its sonar dome rubber window. She deployed on 11 May for her Mediterranean/Indian Ocean deployment 2–89. She transited on 25 June through the Suez Canal into the Red Sea, then from 4–6 July, conducted operations in the Strait of Hormuz, Eastern Patrol Area (SOHEPA). Entering the Persian Gulf on 14 August, she transited the Suez Canal to the Mediterranean Sea on 6 September before returning home on 9 November.

1990s 
From 16 to 28 January 1990, Comte De Grasse spent time at the Vieques Gunnery Range where she earned the designation of Top Gun of the Year. On 15 February 1990, she was visited by a delegation of the Supreme Soviet of the Soviet Union and the Chairman of the U.S. House Committee on Armed Services, Les Aspin.

1991 saw Comte de Grasse undergo a number of qualification training and tests.

From 6 to 10 January 1992, Comte de Grasse took part in the SWET Competition. Then from 13 January to 13 February, she took part in FLEETEX 2–92; followed by Exercise Fabric Falcon Brave form 26 February to 3 March.

Comte de Grasse's superior performance was again recognized in March 1992 when she was awarded a second consecutive Battle Efficiency Award, representative of the best destroyer in Cruiser – Destroyer Group Eight. This prestigious award encompassed Mission Area Excellence Awards in Navigation and Deck Seamanship, Anti-Submarine Warfare (ASW), Anti-Surface Warfare (ASUW), Electronic Warfare (EW), Anti-Aircraft Warfare (AAW), Engineering, Damage Control, Surface Ship Safety, and Command Control and Communications.

In preparation for her next deployment, Comte de Grasse completed Refresher Training in Guantánamo Bay, Cuba, conducted various battle group exercises in the Caribbean Sea, such as FLEETEX 2–92, and successfully passed a myriad of pre-deployment inspections and exercises, including a Combat Systems Assessment (CSA), in which Comte de Grasse received the highest grade of any unit in the entire U.S. Atlantic Fleet during 1991.

Comte de Grasse departed on her next Mediterranean deployment 2–92 on 6 May. She sailed with the  carrier battle group to the Mediterranean Sea and the Red Sea. During the deployment, she took part in intense battle group operations, developed and integrated new tactics for small combatants, conducted maritime interdiction operations in the Red Sea, took part in major exercises, such as NATO Display Determination, and supported United Nations humanitarian efforts in the Adriatic Sea near the troubled lands of the former Yugoslavian Republic.

Comte de Grasse transited the Suez Canal into the Red Sea on 7 September, at which point she conducted maritime interdiction force operations until 20 September when she transited the Suez Canal into the Mediterranean Sea. She returned home on 6 November.

One of the highlights of Comte de Grasse's deployment, was her participation in Grasse Day on 19 October 1992. On the occasion, which honors the French Admiral Francois-Joseph Paul, Comte de Grasse, the officers and crew of the ship took part in ceremonies in Grasse and Bar sur Loup, France. In commemorating the day, which is built on and symbolized by Franco-American friendship, the town of Grasse adopted the warship Comte de Grasse, and proclaimed the town's populace as sponsors of Comte de Grasse.

From 18 January to 15 February 1993, Comte de Grasse took part in Operation Sea Signal in the Caribbean Sea. Then from 3 to 25 May, she conducted counter drug operations in the Caribbean. She spent time dry docked in August, then participated in COMPTUEX, in the Caribbean Sea from 19 to 22 October, before finishing off the year with a fleet exercise in the Cherry Point operations area from 1 to 15 December.

On 12 January 1994, the ship's port main reduction gear was discovered to have been sabotaged, resulting in a delay in its deployment and $600,000 in damage ($ today). It finally got underway for its Mediterranean deployment on 5 February. She conducted operations in the Southern Adriatic in support of Operation Sharp Guard and returned home on 24 June. From 6 September until 1 October, Comte de Grasse took part in Operations Support/Uphold/Restore Democracy in the Haitian operations area.

1995 saw Comte de Grasse take part in CART II, from 7 to 16 January; in COMPTUEX in the Caribbean from 24 April to 14 May; then from 1 July until 3 December, in UNITAS XXXVI-95. UNITAS 95 included operations and port calls in Puerto Rico, Venezuela, Colombia, Ecuador, Peru, Chile, Argentina, Uruguay and Brazil.

From 24 February to 12 March 1996, Comte de Grasse conducted counter drug operations in the Caribbean Sea.

In 1997, she took part in SPONTEX 97–1, from 4 March to 10 April. Then she took part in INDEX 97-3 from 9 to 16 May in the Puerto Rican operations area. Comte de Grasse then took part in UNITAS XXXVIII-97 form 1 July to 26 November 1997.

Decommissioning & disposal 
Comte de Grasse was decommissioned and stricken 5 June 1998 and held at Philadelphia Naval Inactive Ships Maintenance Facility (NISMF) as a parts hulk.

Gallery

References

External links 

 
 navsource.org: USS Comte de Grasse
 united-states-navy.com: USS Comte de Grasse

 

Spruance-class destroyers
Cold War destroyers of the United States
1976 ships
Ships sunk as targets